The All-Ireland Senior Hurling Championship of 1958 was the 72nd staging of Ireland's premier hurling knock-out competition.  Tipperary won the championship, beating Galway 4-9 to 2-5 in the final at Croke Park, Dublin.

The championship

Format

Leinster Championship
First round: (2 matches) These are two lone matches between four 'weaker' teams from the province.  Two teams are eliminated at this stage while the two winners advance to the second round.

Second round: (1 match) This is a single match between the two winners of the first round.  One team is eliminated at this stage while the winners advance to the semi-finals.

Semi-finals: (2 matches) The winners of the second round game join three other Leinster teams to make up the semi-final pairings.  Two teams are eliminated at this stage, while two teams advance to the Leinster final.

Final: (1 match) The winners of the two semi-finals contest this game.  One team is eliminated at this stage, while the winners advance to the All-Ireland semi-final.

Munster Championship

First round: (2 matches) These are two lone matches between the first four teams drawn from the province of Munster.  Two teams are eliminated at this stage while two teams advance to the semi-finals.

Semi-finals: (2 matches) The winners of the two quarter-finals join the other two Munster teams to make up the semi-final pairings.  Two teams are eliminated at this stage while two teams advance to the final.

Final: (1 match) The winners of the two semi-finals contest this game.  One team is eliminated at this stage while the winners advance to the All-Ireland semi-final.

All-Ireland Hurling Championship

Semi-finals: (1 match) The Munster and Leinster champions contest this game.  One team is eliminated at this stage while the winners advance to the All-Ireland final.

Final: (1 match) The winner of the lone semi-final joins Galway, who received a bye, to contest the final.

Results

Leinster Senior Hurling Championship

First round

Second round

Semi-finals

Final

Munster Senior Hurling Championship

First round

Semi-finals

Final

All-Ireland Senior Hurling Championship

Championship statistics

Top scorers

Top scorers overall

Top scorers in a single game

Scoring

Widest winning margin: 32 points
Wexford 9-13 : 2-2 Offaly (Leinster semi-final)
Most goals in a match: 11
Wexford 9-13 : 2-2 Offaly (Leinster semi-final)
Most points in a match: 24
Kilkenny 7-8 : 2-16 Dublin (Leinster semi-final)
Most goals by one team in a match: 9
Wexford 9-13 : 2-2 Offaly (Leinster semi-final)
Most goals scored by a losing team: 3
Clare 3-9 : 5-9 Cork (Munster first round)
Most points scored by a losing team: 16
Dublin 2-16 : 7-8 Kilkenny(Leinster semi-final)

Miscellaneous

 For the first time ever the Munster and Leinster champions clashed in an All-Ireland semi-final.  This was due to Galway receiving a bye to the All-Ireland final without playing a single game.
 The meeting of Tipperary and Galway was both sides first meeting in the All-Ireland final since 1925.

References

 Corry, Eoghan, The GAA Book of Lists (Hodder Headline Ireland, 2005).
 Donegan, Des, The Complete Handbook of Gaelic Games (DBA Publications Limited, 2005).

See also

1958